Aigerim Alimbozova (Äigerım Älımbozova; born 6 September 1992) is a Kazakhstani footballer who plays as a midfielder. She has been a member of the Kazakhstan women's national team.

References

1992 births
Living people
Women's association football midfielders
Kazakhstani women's footballers
Kazakhstan women's international footballers
CSHVSM-Kairat players